In geometry, a parallelotope may refer to:
 A generalization of a parallelepiped and parallelogram
 A generalization of a parallelohedron and parallelogon, this includes all parallelohedra in the first sense

See also 

 Zonotope